Ruellia dissitifolia is a plant native to the Cerrado vegetation of Brazil.

See also
 List of plants of Cerrado vegetation of Brazil

dissitifolia
Flora of Brazil